Forbidden Broadway Cleans Up Its Act is the fifth incarnation of Gerard Alessandrini's Forbidden Broadway, his popular off-Broadway musical revue spoofing "the best of Broadway". All the parody lyrics were written (as always) by Gerard Alessandrini. This version was co-directed by Alessandrini and his long-time collaborator Phillip George. George had up till then only been credited with "Musical Staging" and as "Assistant Director". George also contributed many of the more successful ideas and dialogue sketches to the more recent Forbidden Broadway editions.  The show played in the basement of Ellen's Stardust Diner, and the album is the fifth volume in the series.  Because it features none of the original 1982 Forbidden Broadway cast members, it is labeled "The Unoriginal Cast Recording".  It was recorded in December 1998 and released in 1999.

The leading premise of the show and album is that, like Times Square, FB should drop its raunchy demeanor and "clean up" its parodies.  Naturally, the cast fails spectacularly, meanwhile spoofing new shows like Chicago, The Lion King, Ragtime, Titanic, Jekyll and Hyde, and Footloose.  They also take stabs at personalities like Rudolph Giuliani, Ann Miller, Julie Taymor, Bebe Neuwirth, and Leonardo DiCaprio.

Cast 
The cast members featured on the album and that starred in Cleans Up Its Act when it first opened are listed below:

Bryan Batt*
Lori Hammel
Edward Staudenmayer
Kristine Zbornik
 featured on other FB albums

Tracks 
The musical numbers, with title, original song, and original composers listed, that are featured on the album are listed below:

 A Jolly Holiday With Rudy ("Jolly Holiday")
 Forbidden Broadway Cleans Up Its Act! ("Another Op'nin, Another Show"),
 Chicago - Glosse Fosse ("Razzle Dazzle")
 Footloose - Too Cute ("Footloose")
 The Beauty Queen of Leenane ("How Are Things in Glocca Morra?")
 The Lion King Segment: The Circle Of Mice ("Circle of Life"), Julie Taymor And Her Puppets ("The Lonely Goatherd"), Can You Feel The Pain Tonight? ("Can You Feel the Love Tonight")
 Andrew Lloyd Webber Superstar ("Jesus Christ Superstar" and "Memory")
 Titanic - The Musical: In Every Season ("In Every Age"), Ship Of Air "(There She Is)", The Reviews Are Broadcast ("The Night Is Alive"), Bottom ("Autumn"), There's A Movie Going On ("My Heart Will Go On")
 More Miserable - Ten Years More  ("One Day More")
 Bernadette Peters In Annie Get Your Gun ("There's No Business Like Show Business")
 Swan Lake (various themes from the ballet)
 Ann Miller - I'm Still Weird ("I'm Still Here")
 Jekyll And Hyde: ("Murder-Murder", "No one Knows Who I Am", "This Is My Key Change")
 Ragtime Segment
 Super-Frantic-Hyper-Active-Self-Indulgent-Mandy (Mandy Patinkin in Mamoloshen- Hava Nagila, Dreidel and Supercalifragilisticexpialidocious)
 Cabaret Segment (Wilkommen and Cabaret)
 The Sound Of Music In Cabaret
 Finale - Find Mary Martin ("Climb Ev'ry Mountain")
 Forbidden Broadway Cleans Up Its Act! - Encore
 Bonus Track - Epilogue ("New Music")

See also

 Forbidden Broadway
 Forbidden Broadway, Vol. 1
 Forbidden Broadway, Vol. 2
 Forbidden Broadway, Vol. 3
 Forbidden Hollywood
 Forbidden Broadway Strikes Back
 Forbidden Broadway: 20th Anniversary Edition
 Forbidden Broadway 2001: A Spoof Odyssey
 Forbidden Broadway: Special Victims Unit
 Forbidden Broadway: Rude Awakening
 Forbidden Broadway Goes to Rehab

Off-Broadway musicals